Hüseyin Göçek (born 30 November 1976) is a Turkish international referee who refereed at 2014 FIFA World Cup qualifiers.

He became a FIFA referee in 2008. He was the referee in charge of the under-21s game between Serbia and England which involved the racist and physical abuse of England's black players.

References

External links 
 

1976 births
Living people
Sportspeople from Istanbul
Turkish football referees
UEFA Europa League referees